Buddleja tucumanensis is endemic to the La Paz Department of Bolivia and to the Catamarca Province of Argentina, growing on rocky hillsides, along streams and roads from sea level to 3,300 m. The species was first named and described by Grisebach in 1874.<ref name=Grisebach>Grisebach,  (1874). Abh. Königl. Ges. Wiss. Göttingen 19: 213. 1874.</ref>

DescriptionBuddleja tucumanensis is a dioecious shrub 0.5 – 5 m  in height, with grey fissured bark. The young branches are terete and covered with tomentum. The lower leaves have petioles < 2 cm long, and blades oblong to ovate, 8 – 15 cm long by 2.5 – 5.5 cm wide, subcoriaceous, glabrescent above, tomentose or lanose below, the margin serrate. The upper leaves have shorter petioles, and the blades lanceolate to elliptic 3 – 11 cm long by 1 – 4 cm wide, the margin entire. The yellowish-orange leafy inflorescences comprise hemispheric heads in the axils of the terminal leaves, 5 – 20 heads per branch, each head 1 – 1.5 cm in diameter with 5 – 20 flowers; the corollas 3.5 – 5 mm long. Ploidy: 2n = 38.

CultivationBuddleja tucumanensis'' is not known to be in cultivation beyond Argentina.

References

tucumanensis
Flora of Argentina
Flora of Bolivia
Flora of South America
Dioecious plants